Alexander Football Club is a former Irish football club from Limavady, County Londonderry. It was founded in 1880 by members of the Alexander Cricket Club. and was a founding member of the Irish Football Association. The club played in the early years of the Irish Cup. In 1884, it merged with the Limavady Wanderers club to form Limavady F.C.

References

Association football clubs established in 1880
Association football clubs disestablished in 1884
Defunct association football clubs in Northern Ireland
Association football clubs in County Londonderry
1880 establishments in Ireland
1884 disestablishments in Ireland
Founding members of the Irish Football Association